The Eastern Time Zone (ET) is a time zone encompassing part or all of 23 states in the eastern part of the United States, parts of eastern Canada, the state of Quintana Roo in Mexico, Panama, Colombia, mainland Ecuador, Peru, and a small portion of westernmost Brazil in South America, along with certain Caribbean and Atlantic islands.

Places that use:

 Eastern Standard Time (EST), when observing standard time (autumn/winter), are five hours behind Coordinated Universal Time (UTC−05:00).
 Eastern Daylight Time (EDT), when observing daylight saving time (spring/summer), are four hours behind Coordinated Universal Time (UTC−04:00). 
On the second Sunday in March, at 2:00 a.m. EST, clocks are advanced to 3:00 a.m. EDT leaving a one-hour "gap". On the first Sunday in November, at 2:00 a.m. EDT, clocks are moved back to 1:00 a.m. EST, thus "duplicating" one hour. Southern parts of the zone (Panama and the Caribbean) do not observe daylight saving time.

History
The boundaries of the Eastern Time Zone have moved westward since the Interstate Commerce Commission (ICC) took over time-zone management from railroads in 1938. For example, the easternmost and northernmost counties in Kentucky were added to the zone in the 1940s, and in 1961 most of the state went Eastern. In 2000, Wayne County, on the Tennessee border, switched from Central to Eastern. Within the United States, the Eastern Time Zone is the most populous region, with nearly half of the country's population.

In March 2019, the Florida Legislature passed a bill requesting authorization from Congress for year-round daylight saving time, which would effectively put Florida on Atlantic Standard Time year-round (except for west of the Apalachicola River, which would be on Eastern Standard Time year-round). A similar bill was proposed for the Canadian province of Ontario by its legislative assembly in late 2020, which would have a similar effect on the province if passed.

Daylight saving time
For those in the United States, daylight saving time for the Eastern Time Zone was introduced by the Uniform Time Act of 1966, which specified that daylight saving time would run from the last Sunday of April until the last Sunday in October. The act was amended to make the first Sunday in April the beginning of daylight saving time beginning in 1987.

Later, the Energy Policy Act of 2005 extended daylight saving time in the United States, beginning in 2007. Since then, local times change at 2:00 a.m. EST to 3:00 a.m. EDT on the second Sunday in March, and return from 2:00 a.m. EDT to 1:00 a.m. EST on the first Sunday in November. 

In Canada, daylight saving time begins and ends on the same days and at the same times as it does in the United States.

Canada

In Canada, the following provinces and territories are part of the Eastern Time Zone: Within Canada, as with the United States, the Eastern Time zone is the most populous time zone.
 Most of Ontario
 Most of Quebec
 Most of Nunavut

Most of Canada observes daylight saving time synchronously with the United States, with the exception of Saskatchewan, Yukon, and several other very localized areas.

United States

The boundary between time zones is set forth in the Code of Federal Regulations, with the boundary between the Eastern and Central Time Zones being specifically detailed in 49 C.F.R. part 71.

Washington, D.C. and 17 states are located entirely within the Eastern Time Zone. They are:

 Connecticut
 Delaware
 Georgia
 Maine
 Maryland
 Massachusetts
 New Hampshire
 New Jersey
 New York
 North Carolina
 Ohio
 Pennsylvania
 Rhode Island
 South Carolina
 Vermont
 Virginia
 West Virginia

Five states are partly in the Eastern Time Zone, with the remaining portions in the Central Time Zone. The following locations observe Eastern Time:

 Florida – peninsula and Big Bend regions east of the Apalachicola River along with portions of Gulf County south of the Intracoastal Waterway.
 Indiana – all except for northwest (Gary) and southwest (Evansville) regions
 Kentucky – eastern 60%, including the state's three largest metropolitan areas: Louisville, Lexington, Northern Kentucky
 Michigan – all, except for the four Upper Peninsula counties that border Wisconsin: Gogebic, Iron, Dickinson, and Menominee
 Tennessee – East Tennessee

Additionally, Phenix City, Alabama, and several nearby communities in Russell County, Alabama, unofficially observe Eastern Time. This is due to their close proximity to Columbus, Georgia, which is on Eastern Time.

Mexico

 Quintana Roo: This is the only Mexican state to observe EST. It moved from Central Time to Eastern Time after a successful lobbying effort by tourism interests.  Quintana Roo does not observe daylight saving time.

Caribbean islands
The Bahamas and Haiti officially observe both Eastern Standard Time during the winter months and Eastern Daylight Time during the summer months. Cuba generally follows the U.S. with Eastern Standard Time in the winter, and Eastern Daylight Time in the summer, but the exact day of change varies year to year. The Cayman Islands and Jamaica use Eastern Standard Time year-round.

Turks and Caicos Islands
The Turks and Caicos Islands followed Eastern Time with daylight saving until 2015, when the territory switched to the Atlantic Time Zone. The Turks and Caicos Islands switched back to the pre-2015 schedule in March 2018. A 2017 consultation paper highlighted the advantage for business and tourism of being in the same time zone as the eastern United States as an important factor in the decision.

South America
In South America, the Brazilian states of Acre and the southwest part of Amazonas use Eastern Standard Time. In 2008, Brazil changed the zone of these regions to be closer to that of the Brazilian Capital; however, the change was unpopular and thus undone in 2013. Additionally, the countries of Panama, Colombia, Peru, and Ecuador (excluding the Galápagos Islands, which use Central Standard Time), also use Eastern Standard Time year-round.

See also
 Effects of time zones on North American broadcasting

References

External links
 Official U.S. time in the Eastern time zone
 North American Time Zone border data and images
 World time zone map 
 U.S. time zone map
 History of U.S. time zones and UTC conversion 
 Canada time zone map
 Time zones for major world cities
 Official times across Canada
 Federal Regulations defining time zones

Time in Canada
Time in Mexico
Time zones
Time zones in the United States